Cochylimorpha montana is a species of moth of the family Tortricidae. It is found in north-eastern Afghanistan and Iran.

The wingspan is 20.5–24.5 mm. The ground colour of the forewings is cream white with a row of dark brownish dots. The hindwings are light brownish cream and darker than the forewings.

References

Moths described in 1967
Cochylimorpha
Taxa named by Józef Razowski
Moths of Asia